What If may refer to:

Film 
 What If, a 2006 TV film starring Niall Buggy
 What If... (2010 film), an American film
 What If... (2012 film), a Greek film
 What If (2013 film) or The F Word, a Canadian-Irish film

Television 
 What/If, a 2019 American thriller streaming miniseries
 What If... (web series), a 2010 American soap-opera crossover series
 What If...? (TV series), a 2021 American animated series by Marvel Studios
 "What If..." (Agents of S.H.I.E.L.D.), an episode of Agents of S.H.I.E.L.D.
 "What If" (Drop Dead Diva), an episode of Drop Dead Diva
 "What If?" (JAG), an episode of JAG

Literature 
 Alternate history, fiction based on what if historical questions
 Alternate universe (fan fiction), fiction based on what if questions in fiction
 "What If—", a fantasy short story by Isaac Asimov
 What If? (book), an xkcd blog and associated book by Randall Munroe
 What If (comics), comic book series featuring alternate versions of the Marvel Comics universe
 What If? (essays), an anthology of counterfactual history essays
 What If? (magazine), a Canadian arts and literature youth magazine
 What If...?: Amazing Stories selected by Monica Hughes, a book by Monica Hughes

Music

Albums
 What If (Dixie Dregs album) or the title song, 1978
 What If? (Emerson Drive album) or the title song, 2004
 What If (Jerry Douglas album) or the title song, 2017
 What If? (Kenny Barron album) or the title song, 1986
 What If... (Mr. Big album), 2011
 What If (Tommy Shaw album) or the title song, 1985
 What If..., by Burns Blue, 2003

Songs
 "What If" (112 song), 2005
 "What If" (Ashley Tisdale song), 2009
 "What If" (Babyface song), 2001
 "What If" (Colbie Caillat song), 2011
 "What If" (Creed song), 1999
 "What If" (Dina Garipova song), 2013
 "What If" (Friends song), featuring Darin, 2009
 "What If" (Jason Derulo song), 2010
 "What If" (Kate Winslet song), 2001
 "What If" (Reba McEntire song), 1997
 "What If", by Aaliyah from Aaliyah, 2001
 "What If", by Adrienne Bailon from The Cheetah Girls: One World soundtrack album, 2008
 "What If?", by AJ McLean from Have It All, 2010
 "What If", by Armin van Buuren from Imagine, 2008
 "What If", by Blanca, 2018
 "What If", by Cog from Sharing Space, 2008
 "What If", by Coldplay from X&Y, 2005
 "What If...?", by Control Denied from The Fragile Art of Existence, 1999
 "What If", by Craig David from Following My Intuition, 2016
 "What If", by Emilie Autumn from Enchant, 2003
 "What If", by Esmée Denters from Outta Here, 2009
 "What If", by Five for Fighting from Bookmarks, 2013
 "What If?", by Godsmack from The Oracle, 2010
 "What If...", by J-Hope from Jack in the Box, 2022
 "What If", by Johnny Orlando and Mackenzie Ziegler, 2018
 "What If", by Kevin Gates from By Any Means 2, 2017
 "What If", by King Missile from King Missile, 1994
 "What If", by Nicole Nordemann from Brave, 2005
 "What If", by PureNRG from PureNRG, 2007
 "What If", by Ruben Studdard from Soulful, 2003
 "What If", by Simple Plan from Simple Plan, 2008
 "What If", written by Andrew Lippa for the musical The Addams Family, 2009

Other uses
 What-if analysis, or sensitivity analysis, the study of how model output varies with changes in input
 What if chart, a visual tool for modeling the outcome of a combination of different factors
 WHAT IF software, a molecular modeling and visualization package

See also
 Alternate history
 Counterfactual history
 If (disambiguation)
 Hypothetical question
 Uchronia
 What (disambiguation)